Batres is a surname. Notable people with the surname include:

Carlos Batres (born 1968), Guatemalan football referee
Bella Batres (born 2001), American actress and micro niche internet celebrity
Eugenio Batres Garcia (born 1941), Nicaraguan journalist, political commentator, newscaster and writer
Jaime Batres (born 1964), Guatemalan footballer
José Batres Montúfar (1809–1844), Guatemalan poet, politician, engineer and military figure
Leopoldo Batres (1852–1926), Mexican archeologist
Luis Batres Juarros (1802–1862), Guatemalan politician
Martí Batres (born 1967), Mexican politician
Roberto Batres (born 1986), Spanish footballer
Valentina Batres Guadarrama (born 1971), Mexican politician
Yolani Batres, Honduran politician
Luis Perez Batres, Mexican/American University Professor and Administrator